Half a Moon and One Whole Star is a 1986 book by Crescent Dragonwagon and illustrator Jerry Pinkney about a girl, Susan, who falls asleep in her bed, while the world continues outside.

Reception
Publishers Weekly in a review of Half a Moon and One Whole Star, wrote " Half A Moon and One Whole Star is an exceptional children's book: a work of art, both literary and visual." and School Library Journal called it "a soft symphony of sleep in which participants are both real and imagined."

Kirkus Reviews wrote "The cadence and the sensual images of the text, coupled with the artist's direct, yet subtly disjointed pictures in vivid watery colors, combine for a harmonious nighttime symphony of sound and color."

Half a Moon received the 1987 Coretta Scott King Illustrator Award.

References

1986 children's books
1986 poetry books
American picture books
American poetry collections
Children's poetry books
Picture books by Jerry Pinkney
Coretta Scott King Award-winning works
Sleep in fiction